Cleavage stimulation factor 50 kDa subunit is a protein that in humans is encoded by the CSTF1 gene.

This gene encodes one of three subunits which combine to form cleavage stimulation factor (CSTF). CSTF is involved in the polyadenylation and 3' end cleavage of pre-mRNAs. Similar to mammalian G protein beta subunits, this protein contains transducin-like repeats. Several transcript variants with different 5' UTR, but encoding the same protein, have been found for this gene.

Interactions 

CSTF1 has been shown to interact with BARD1.

References

External links

Further reading